Thomas Herbert, 8th Earl of Pembroke and 5th Earl of Montgomery,  (c. 165622 January 1733), styled The Honourable Thomas Herbert until 1683, was an English and later British statesman during the reigns of William III and Anne.

Background
Herbert was the third son of Philip Herbert, 5th Earl of Pembroke and his wife Catharine Villiers, daughter of Sir William Villiers, 1st Baronet who was the half-brother of the 1st Duke of Buckingham, George Villiers. Through his grandmother, Susan de Vere, he was a great-grandson of Edward de Vere, 17th Earl of Oxford, the Oxfordians' William Shakespeare. He was educated at Tonbridge School, Kent. Both of his brothers (the 6th Earl and the 7th Earl) having died without a male heir, he succeeded to the earldoms in 1683. Through them, he would inherit the family seat of the Earls of Pembroke, Wilton House in Wiltshire.

Public life
Herbert was returned unopposed as Member of Parliament for Wilton at the two general elections of 1679 and the general election of 1681. He was no longer able to sit in the House of Commons after assuming the peerage in 1683. From 1690 to 1692 as Lord Pembroke, he was First Lord of the Admiralty. He then served as Lord Privy Seal until 1699, being in 1697 the first plenipotentiary of Great Britain at the congress of Ryswick. On two occasions he was Lord High Admiral for a short period; he was also Lord President of the Council and Lord Lieutenant of Ireland, while he acted as one of the Lords Justices seven times; and he was President of the Royal Society in 1689–1690. He is the dedicatee of John Locke's An Essay Concerning Human Understanding and Thomas Greenhill's The Art of Embalming.

Marriages and progeny
He married three times:
Firstly in 1684 to Margaret Sawyer, only daughter of Sir Robert Sawyer of Highclere Castle by his wife Margaret Suckeley, by whom he had seven sons and five daughters:
Henry Herbert, 9th Earl of Pembroke (c. 1689–1750), eldest son and heir
Hon. Robert Sawyer Herbert (died 1769), who inherited Highclere Castle
Hon. Charles Herbert
Hon. Thomas Herbert (c. 1695–1739)
Maj-Gen. Hon. William Herbert (c. 169631 March 1757), married Catherine Elizabeth Tewes (died 28 August 1770) and had Henry Herbert, 1st Earl of Carnarvon, who inherited Highclere Castle from his uncle
Hon. John Herbert
Hon. Nicholas Herbert (c. 1706–1775), husband of Anne North
Lady Catherine Herbert (died September 1716), wife of Sir Nicholas Morice, 2nd Baronet
Lady Margaret Herbert (died 15 December 1752)
Lady Elizabeth Herbert
Lady Anne Herbert
Lady Rebecca Herbert, wife of William Nevill, 16th Baron Bergavenny
Secondly in 1708 he married Barbara Slingsby (died 1 August 1721), daughter of Sir Thomas Slingsby, 2nd Baronet and widow of John Arundell, 2nd Baron Arundell of Trerice (1649–1698), of Trerice, Cornwall, by whom he had one daughter:
Lady Barbara Herbert (died 27 December 1752), who on 3 October 1730 married William Dudley North. 
Thirdly he married Mary Howe (died 1749), daughter of Scrope Howe, 1st Viscount Howe; they had no children. She subsequently married John Mordaunt, MP.

See also
 List of presidents of the Royal Society

References

|-

|-

|-

|-

|-

|-

|-

1650s births
1733 deaths
Year of birth uncertain
Thomas Herbert, 08th Earl of Pembroke
8
Thomas
Fellows of the Royal Society
Garter Knights appointed by William III
Lord High Admirals
Lord High Admirals of England
Lord-Lieutenants of Brecknockshire
Lord-Lieutenants of Cardiganshire
Lord-Lieutenants of Carmarthenshire
Lord-Lieutenants of Glamorgan
Lord-Lieutenants of Monmouthshire
Lord-Lieutenants of Pembrokeshire
Lord-Lieutenants of Radnorshire
Lord-Lieutenants of Wiltshire
Lord Presidents of the Council
First Lords of the Admiralty
Lords Privy Seal
Members of the Privy Council of England
Members of the Privy Council of Great Britain
Presidents of the Royal Society
Ambassadors of England to the Netherlands
Younger sons of earls
English MPs 1679
English MPs 1680–1681
English MPs 1681
Lords Lieutenant of Ireland